Stephen Downing may refer to:

 Stephen Downing, whose conviction for the murder of Wendy Sewell was quashed
 Stephen Downing (producer), American (born Oct. 28 1938) screenwriter, producer, activist, and investigative journalist 
 Steve Downing (born 1950), American retired basketball player